Narthecius is a genus of beetles in the family Laemophloeidae, containing the following species:

 Narthecius crassiceps Sharp
 Narthecius grandiceps LeConte
 Narthecius haroldi Reitter
 Narthecius longicollis (Sharp)
 Narthecius monticola Fall
 Narthecius schedli Lefkovitch
 Narthecius simulator Casey
 Narthecius striaticeps Fall
 Narthecius suturalis Grouvelle

References

Laemophloeidae
Cucujoidea genera